The Valle Mesolcina, also known as the Val Mesolcina or Misox (German), is an alpine valley of the Grisons, Switzerland, stretching from the San Bernardino Pass to Grono where it joins the Calanca Valley. It is the valley formed by the river Moesa.

Like the Val Bregaglia or the Val Poschiavo, the Valle Mesolcina is a valley lying south of the main ridge of the Alps. Although politically the Valle Mesolcina belongs to the Grisons, its population is predominantly Italian-speaking and culturally oriented towards the Ticino.

The valley includes the Mesocco and Roveredo  of the Moesa district, including:
 Mesocco
 Soazza
 Lostallo
 Verdabbio
 Cama
 Leggia
 Grono
 Roveredo
 San Vittore

External links

Mesolcina
Valleys of the Alps